Poplar Lane, also known as "Ballygomingo," is a historic home located near King of Prussia in Upper Merion Township, Montgomery County, Pennsylvania.  The original house was built in 1758, and expanded in 1816 and about 1821.  It is a two-story, stucco over stone building.  It features a portico.

It was added to the National Register of Historic Places in 1978.

References

Houses on the National Register of Historic Places in Pennsylvania
Houses completed in 1821
Houses in Montgomery County, Pennsylvania
National Register of Historic Places in Montgomery County, Pennsylvania
Upper Merion Township, Montgomery County, Pennsylvania